Titan Tower, also known as The Titan, is the largest of the Fisher Towers near Moab and Castle Valley, Utah.  It has also been attributed to be the largest, free-standing, natural tower in the United States.  The tower contains the Finger of Fate Route, first climbed in 1962, which is recognized in the historic climbing text Fifty Classic Climbs of North America and considered a classic around the world.

References

External links 
 RockClimbing.com
 SummitPost.org
 MountainProject.com

Mountains of Utah
Climbing areas of Utah
Mountains of Grand County, Utah